Devī Bāla Tripurasundarī, also known as Bālāmbikā, is the younger aspect of the Hindu Goddess Tripura Sundarī one of the ten forms of the Supreme Goddess Mahadevī (Mahavidya).

There are 64 forms of Goddess Bālā and her Bāla Tripurasundarī form is widely worshipped because of the Śrī  Vidyā community. She is the first diety whose mantra is received by a person in Śrī Krama.

References in Hindu literature 

Within the Brahmanda Purana,  Devi Bala Tripura Sundari is mentioned in chapter 26 of the Lalita Mahatmya, where she joins the battle against the forces of the arch-demon Bhandasura:

 On hearing that the sons of Daitya Bhaņḑa the chief of whom was Caturbāhu had come for the purpose of fighting, Bālā (the daughter of Lalitā) showed interest in it. She was the daughter of Lalitā Devi. She came from the golden kavasa of lalita. She always stayed near the goddess. She was worthy of being worshipped by all Śaktis. She was adept in martial feats and exploits. Her form and features were like those of Lalitā. She was always like a nine-year-old girl, yet she was a great mine of all lore. Her body was like the rising sun. Her creeper-like slender body was [missing text] in complexion. She was perpetually present near the footrest of the great queen. She was as it were the vital breath of the goddess moving externally. She was her fourth eye. She became furious and thought thus  : "I shall immediately kill those sons of Bhanda who have come here". After making up her mind thus, Bālāmbā submitted to the great queen.

 "Mother, the sons of Bhaņḑa, the great Daitya, have come to fight. I wish to fight with them. I am interested in this because I am a young girl. My arms throb with an itching sensation for war. This is my playful activity. It should not be curbed by your orders for prohibition. Indeed I am a girl loving toys and playful pastimes. By this play of fighting for a moment, I shall become delighted mentally."

 "Dear child, your limbs are very tender and soft. You are only nine years old. This is your first step and performance. Your training in warfare is fresh and recent. You are my only daughter. Without you, my breathing activity does not go on even for a moment. You are my very vital breath. Do not go in for the great war. We have Daņḑinī, Mantriņī and crores of other great Śaktis for fighting. Dear child, why do you commit this blunder?"

 Although prevented thus by Śri Lalitādevī, the girl was overcome by curiosity. She requested once again for permission to fight. On observing her steadfast decision, Srīlalitā, the mother, granted her permission after closely clasping her in her arms. She took off one of her armors and gave it to her. From her weapons, she gave her the requisite weapons and sent her off. Kūmārikā got into the covered palanquin that had been extracted by the great queen from the staff of her bow and to which hundreds of swans were yoked for drawing. She killed all 30 sons of the demon Bhandasura which was extremely difficult to do.

See also 

 Tripura Sundari
 Parvati
 Sri Chakra

References

External links 

 Sri Bala Tripura Sundari Mantra

Hindu goddesses